Nico Petrus Johannes Freriks (born 22 December 1981 in Uden, North Brabant) is a former volleyball player from the Netherlands, who represented his native country at the 2004 Summer Olympics in Athens, Greece. There he ended up in ninth place with the Dutch Men's National Team. Freriks was named Best Setter at the 2004 Men's Volleyball Olympic Qualifier in Madrid, Spain.

Club
 Hovoc Horst 1993-1998 (Junior)
 Facopa Weert 1998-1999 (Junior)
 SSS Barneveld 1999-2001
 Noliko Maaseik 2001-2003
 Omniworld Almere 2003-2005
 Hypo Tyrol Innsbruck 2005-2006
 Knack Randstad Roeselare 2006-2008
 Jastrzębski Węgiel 2008-2009
 Nesselande Rotterdam 2009-2010
 Unicaja Almeria 2010-2011
 Knack Roeselare 2011-2012
 Lokomotiv Belogorie 2012-2012
 Moerser SC 2012-2013
 Bre Banca Lannutti Cuneo 2013-2013
 Beauvais Oise 2013-2014
 Kalleh Mazandaran 2014-2014
 Paykan Tehran 2014-2015
 Kalleh 2015-2015
 Hovoc Horst 2016-2017

References
  Dutch Olympic Committee

1981 births
Living people
People from Uden
Dutch men's volleyball players
Volleyball players at the 2004 Summer Olympics
Olympic volleyball players of the Netherlands
Jastrzębski Węgiel players
Dutch expatriate sportspeople in Poland
Expatriate volleyball players in Poland
Sportspeople from North Brabant